Indigo is the third album by British pop/jazz/soul/dance band Matt Bianco, released in July 1988.

Overview
This was Warner Brothers' attempt to launch Matt Bianco in the United States, hence the hiring of Emilio Estefan (Gloria Estefan's husband) as producer. He contributed to three of the tracks on the album, including the first single "Don't Blame It on That Girl". By reaching number 23 in the UK Albums Chart, Indigo became the highest-charting album for the group, and it also includes their highest-charting single, the double A-side "Don't Blame It on That Girl" / "Wap-Bam-Boogie", reaching number 11 in the UK Singles Chart. Indigo follows the path started with the previous album, the eponymous Matt Bianco from 1986, achieving even more success. The album was promoted by three more singles: "Good Times", "Nervous", and "Say It's Not Too Late", none of which had any commercial success, stalling in the lower parts of the charts―"Say It's Not Too Late" did not even enter the UK Top 75, and it would be included as a B-side on "What a Fool Believes", the second single from the fourth studio album by the band, Samba in Your Casa from 1991.

The success of "Wap-Bam-Boogie" pushed the group not only to release a number of remix versions of the hit, at the time and in the following years, but it prompted them towards more of a dance influence in their style which, though disappointing early fans, would gain them new ones; however, maybe for a matter of balance, their next studio album, Samba in Your Casa, would feature a much more Latin pop-oriented sound than their previous albums, though not abandoning the dance rhythms.

Track listing
All tracks written and arranged by Mark Reilly and Mark Fisher.

Note
 Tracks 11 and 12 on CD only.

Personnel
Adapted from the album's liner notes.

Matt Bianco
Mark Reilly – vocals
Mark Fisher – keyboards, piano, additional synths, melodica, brass arrangements

Other musicians
Robert Ahwai – guitar
Ambassador – vocals (track 4)
Guy Barker – trumpet, flugelhorn
Randy Barlow – trumpet
Ed Calle – tenor saxophone
Jorge Casas – bass guitar
Paquito Hechavarría – acoustic piano
Sheila Ferguson – backing vocals
Weston Foster – backing vocals
Joy Francis – backing vocals
Robin Jones – percussion
Dee Lewis – percussion
Shirley Lewis – backing vocals
Teddy Mulet – trumpet
Trevor Murrel – drums
Clay Ostwald – keyboards, synth programming, drum programming
Rafael Padilla – percussion
Ronnie Ross – brass, saxophone
Jon Secada – backing vocals
Jamie Talbot – saxophone
Phil Todd – saxophone
Dig Wayne – backing vocals
Tony Fisher, Derek Watkins, Dave Bishop, Stan Sulzmann – brass

Production
Ian Curnow – additional programming
Brad Davis – engineer
Pete Hammond – mixing
Phil Harding – mixing, remixing
Sheila Rock – photography
Paul Samuelson – engineer
Graham Smith – photography, sleeve design
Dana Horowitz, Patrice, Bob, Head, Cliff, Giles Scrumpy, Mickey Mulligan, Kevin, Tony, Carl – assistants
Tracks 1, 11 & 12 produced by Emilio Estefan, Jorge Casas and Clay Ostwald
Tracks 2–10 produced and arranged by Mark Reilly and Mark Fisher
Track 1 engineered and mixed by Eric Schilling

Weekly charts

Singles taken from the album
May 1988 – "Don't Blame It on That Girl" / "Wap-Bam-Boogie" (double A-side) (UK No. 11 – 13 weeks)
August 1988 – "Good Times" (UK No. 55 – 5 weeks)
January 1989 – "Nervous" / "Wap-Bam-Boogie (re-mix)" (UK No. 59 – 2 weeks)
April 1989 – "Say It's Not Too Late"

Certifications

References

External links
 Matt Bianco's detailed discography
 Amazon.com: audio clips, cover art, track listing, reviews, and other details on the Indigo album

1988 albums
Matt Bianco albums
Warner Records albums
Albums produced by Emilio Estefan